This is a list of the main association football rivalries in Belgium.

National rivalries
 The Clasico: Anderlecht vs. Standard Liège
 The Topper: R.S.C. Anderlecht–Club Brugge KV rivalry: Anderlecht vs. Club Brugge.
 The Battle of Flanders: Club Brugge vs. Gent. Named after the Battle of Flanders, a name given to several historic actual battles fought in the region, during World War I.
 The Walloon derby: Standard Liège vs. Charleroi Note that despite being called a derby, these cities are over 80km apart and Liège is for instance much closer to Brussels than to Charleroi. With Charleroi and Liège being two of the most important cities in Wallonia however, this rivalry has received a specific name as The Walloon derby.

City derbies
 Antwerp derby, match to determine the Ploeg van 't Stad: mainly between Antwerp and Beerschot. Berchem Sport also has a rich history and featured a lot in the Antwerp derby, but is currently playing in the lower divisions.
 Bruges derby: Club Brugge vs. Cercle Brugge .
 Brussels derby: RWDM Brussels vs. Anderlecht vs. Union SG. The derby between RWDM and Union SG is called the "Zwanze derby".
 Charleroi derby: Olympic Charleroi vs. Sporting Charleroi.
 Ghent derby:  AA Gent vs. Racing Gent.
 Liège derby: RFC Liège vs. Standard Liège
 Lier derby: Lierse vs. Lyra
 Mechelen derby: KV Mechelen vs. Racing Mechelen

Regional derbies
 Wallonia derby: Standard de Liege vs. Royal Charleroi

 Liege derby: Standard de Liege vs. Seraing
Limburg derby: Genk vs. Sint-Truiden
East Flanders Derbies: 
Gent vs. Lokeren-Temse
Waasland Derby: original a derby between KSK Beveren vs. Sporting Lokeren. After the bankruptcy of both clubs, it continued under the following clubs Lokeren-Temse vs. Waasland-Beveren or YB SK Beveren
South West Flanders derby: Zulte-Waregem vs. Kortrijk. Used to include Roeselare as well, until it defaulted in 2020. While not in West Flanders but just over the border to Hainaut, Mouscron could also be included due to its very close proximity, especially towards Kortrijk (15 km).
Antwerp Province derby: Lierse Kempenzonen vs. KV Mechelen
Denderstreek derby: Dender vs. Eendracht Aalst
East of Flemish Brabant derby: OH Leuven vs. Tienen.

References

Football in Belgium